Romanovo is a rural locality (a village) in Slednevskoye Rural Settlement, Alexandrovsky District, Vladimir Oblast, Russia. The population was 68 as of 2010. There are 3 streets.

Geography 
Romanovo is located on the Chyornaya River, 13 km west of Alexandrov (the district's administrative centre) by road. Sokolovo is the nearest rural locality.

References 

Rural localities in Alexandrovsky District, Vladimir Oblast